The Ruf CTR2 (Group C, Turbo Ruf, 2nd generation) was a 2-door sports car built by German automobile manufacturer Ruf Automobile as the successor to the CTR Yellowbird, but based on Porsche's Type 993 generation 911.

History

Ruf came into the public eye in 1987 when they released their Porsche 911 Carrera 3.2-based CTR, an extremely limited-production model which for several years held the title of world's fastest production vehicle. Wanting an ultra-high performance model to remain among the company offerings, Alois Ruf Jr., the company owner, followed up the original with a CTR2 in 1995, another production model made in limited quantities, based on the then-new 993-chassis 911 Turbo. Originally offered at a retail Price of $315,000 USD, the CTR2 featured either the standard rear-wheel drive or an optional all-wheel-drive, Recaro racing seats with Simpson five-point belts, enlarged brakes, an integrated roll-cage, a Ruf manufactured coil-over suspension system, an integrated bi-functional rear wing (for downforce, and air induction to 2 intercoolers, one on each side) and a kevlar body with lightweight glass; power came from a race derived air-cooled Porsche 3.6 litre, twin-turbocharged Flat-six engine, based on the engine used in the Porsche 962 Le Mans Group C car (hence the name CTR2) but tuned by Ruf to produce  and 505 ft lb (685 N·m) of torque.

The McLaren F1 was the only other production car at the time that broke the CTR2's record, by clocking a top speed of 241 mph in 1998, which then made the Ruf CTR2 the 2nd fastest production car of the decade.

Motorsport
These cars were built to both FIA and Pikes Peak regulations, and driven by brothers Steve Beddor and David Beddor. Unlike other competitors, both cars were race modified, while also being road registered, street legal cars. As demonstration of the Ruf's flexibility, they were street driven to and from the Pikes Peak racecourse. In the event, the Ruf CTR2sport driven by Steve Beddor placed 1st in overall qualifying and finished 2nd overall in the race, while his brother David in the second Ruf finished 4th overall. Steve Beddor's 'Pikes Peak' prototype Ruf CTR2sport, went on to win the Virginia City Hill Climb 3 times, as well as finishing 1st-place in 20 other races nationwide, making it arguably one of the most important 'non-Zuffenhausen' Porsche racecars of the 1990s.

Production
16 standard CTR2s were produced, alongside 12 CTR2 "Sport" versions.

Specifications

Weight: 
Tyres: 245/35ZR-19 front, 285/30ZR-19 rear
Power:  at 5800 rpm (1995-'96) ; 580 hp (433 kw) at 5900 rpm (1997)
Torque:  at 4800 rpm
Specific output: approx.  per litre
Power-to-weight ratio: 382 hp per tonne (at 5800 rpm); 427 hp per tonne (at 5900 rpm)
0-: 3.6 seconds
0-: 7.6 seconds
Top Speed: 
Power (CTR2sport Pikes Peak Racecar - motor # 36011):  at 7300 rpm
Torque (CTR2sport Pikes Peak Racecar):  at 5500 rpm

Test results

A 520 hp CTR2 was tested by Dennis Simanitis for the February 1997 issue of Road & Track with the following results:

0-: 3.6 seconds
0-: 5.6 seconds
0-: 7.9 seconds
0-: 9.0 seconds
Quarter mile: 11.4 seconds at 

The tester noted that he suspected that the magazine's Road Test Editor would be even "a couple of tenths quicker" to 60 mph and that "there’s every reason to believe the Silver Flash is capable of an honest 350 km/h (217 mph) or more".

A test of another 520 hp CTR2 in a March 1997 issue of Auto, Motor und Sport yielded:

0-: 3.6 seconds
0-: 7.6 seconds
Standing kilometer: 20.8 seconds

References

External links 

http://auto-specs.zercustoms.com/r/ruf/1997-ruf-ctr-2-specifications.html ZerCustoms about the Ruf 911 CTR2

Coupés
Sports cars
Rear-engined vehicles
All-wheel-drive vehicles
CTR2
Cars introduced in 1995